Raymond Berengar (died 1374) was an Aragonese knight and the 30th Grand Master of the Knights Hospitaller from 1365 to 1374 while the Order was based in Rhodes. He was succeeded by Robert de Juilly.

References 

1374 deaths
Christians of the Crusades
Grand Masters of the Knights Hospitaller
14th-century French people
Year of birth unknown